Thierry Bollin (born 11 January 2000) is a Swiss backstroke swimmer. He competed in the men's 50 metre backstroke event at the 2018 FINA World Swimming Championships (25 m), in Hangzhou, China.

References

External links
 

2000 births
Living people
Swiss male backstroke swimmers
Place of birth missing (living people)
21st-century Swiss people